Marcos Vinicios Lopes Moura (born 23 February 2001), known as Marcos Vinicios or Sorriso, is a Brazilian footballer who plays as a forward for Red Bull Bragantino

Club career

Juventude
Born in Natal, Rio Grande do Norte, Sorriso joined Juventude's youth setup in 2017, from ABC. He was promoted to the main squad for the 2021 campaign, and made his senior debut on 1 March of that year, coming on as a late substitute for Yago in a 0–1 Campeonato Gaúcho away loss against Internacional.

On 5 March 2021, Sorriso renewed his contract with Ju for three seasons. He scored his first senior goal on 1 April, netting the game's only goal in a 1–0 home success over Aimoré.

Sorriso made his Série A debut on 29 May 2021, replacing Chico in a 2–2 away draw against Cuiabá.

Red Bull Bragantino
On 21 January 2022, Red Bull Bragantino announced the signing of Sorriso, on a five-year contract.

Career statistics

References

External links
EC Juventude profile 

2001 births
Living people
People from Natal, Rio Grande do Norte
Brazilian footballers
Association football forwards
Campeonato Brasileiro Série A players
Esporte Clube Juventude players
Red Bull Bragantino players
Sportspeople from Rio Grande do Norte